Robert or Bob Conley may refer to:

 Robert Conley (basketball) (born 1977), American basketball player
 Robert Conley (music producer) (born 1973), American record producer, programmer and engineer
 Robert Conley (reporter) (1928–2013), American reporter
 Robert B. Conley, American judge, Associate Justice of the Kentucky Supreme Court
 Robert J. Conley (1940–2014), Cherokee author
 Bob Conley (born 1965), American politician
 Bob Conley (baseball) (born 1934), American baseball player